Möve or Moeve may refer to:

 Möve 101, an Austrian built microcar
 Move (1939 ship), a former passenger ship on Lake Zurich, Switzerland
 SMS Möwe, several ships of the German and Austro-Hungarian navies